"Talibani", derived as an adjective from the Arabic, طالب ṭālib, "student", may refer to
 Something of, or relating to, the Taliban Islamic fundamentalist political movement in Afghanistan
 Something of, or relating to, a student
 Jalal Talabani (1933–2017), Iraqi Kurdish politician who served as the sixth President of Iraq from 2005 to 2014